Mount Watkins may refer to:
 Mount Watkins, a U.S. peak in Yosemite National Park named after Carleton Watkins
 Mount Watkin / Hikaroroa, a peak in New Zealand